Mark A. Raider is an American historian.  He is a professor of modern Jewish history at the University of Cincinnati.

Raider received his B.A. from the University of California at Santa Cruz and his M.A. and Ph.D. from Brandeis University.  He has previously served as chair of the Judaic Studies Department at the University at Albany, SUNY and was founding director of its Center for Jewish Studies. He moved to Cincinnati in 2006.

Books
Raider is the author of The Emergence of American Zionism (1998).

His edited volumes include:
 The Essential Hayim Greenberg: Essays and Addresses on Jewish Culture, Socialism, and Zionism (2017)
 Nahum Goldmann: Statesman Without a State (2009)
 American Jewish Women and the Zionist Enterprise, with Shulamit Reinharz (2005)
 The Plough Woman; Records of the Pioneer Women of Palestine — A Critical Edition, with Miriam B. Raider-Roth (2002)
 Abba Hillel Silver and American Zionism, with Jonathan D. Sarna and Ronald W. Zweig (1997)

References

Historians of Jews and Judaism
21st-century American historians
21st-century American male writers
University at Albany, SUNY faculty
University of Cincinnati faculty
Living people
Year of birth missing (living people)
Brandeis University alumni
University of California, Santa Cruz alumni
American male non-fiction writers